Events from the year 1636 in art.

Events
 (unknown)

Paintings

 Orazio Gentileschi - Allegory of Peace and the Arts (ceiling for The Queen's House, Greenwich; now at Marlborough House, London)
 Nicolas Poussin
A Dance to the Music of Time (La Danse des Saisons; 1634-36)
The Triumph of Pan and The Triumph of Bacchus (decoration of Cardinal Richelieu's château) (1635-36)
 Rembrandt
Belshazzar's Feast (1635-36)
The Blinding of Samson (using chiaroscuro)
Susanna 
 Danae 

 Peter Paul Rubens
An Autumn Landscape with a View of Het Steen in the Early Morning
Hercules' Dog Discovers Purple Dye (sketch; approximate date)
The Judgement of Paris (first version; approximate date)
 Anthony van Dyck - Charles I in Three Positions (1635-36)

Births
March - Lancelot Volders, Flemish portrait painter (died 1723)
November - Adriaen van de Velde, Dutch animal and landscape painter (died 1672)
date unknown
Giovanni Battista Beinaschi, Italian painter and engraver active in the late-Renaissance period (died 1688)
Giovanni Coli, Italian painter from Lucca (died 1691)
Filippo Maria Galletti, Italian painter of religious works and a Theatine priest (died 1714)
Philippe Lallemand, French portrait painter (died 1716)
Agostino Lamma, Italian painter specializing in battle paintings  (died 1700)
Antoine Masson, French line engraver (died 1700)
Tommaso Misciroli, Italian painter from Faenza (died 1699)
Catharina Oostfries, Dutch glass painter (died 1709)
Claudine Bouzonnet-Stella, French engraver (died 1697)
Giovanni Maria Viani, Italian painter and etcher (died 1700)
Zou Zhe, Chinese painter of the Qing Dynasty (died 1708)
probable
Gerrit Battem, Dutch landscape painter (died 1684)
Étienne Baudet, French engraver (died 1711)
Jacob Gillig, Dutch Golden Age painter of still lifes, usually of fish, as well as portraits (died 1701)
Melchior d'Hondecoeter, Dutch painter of exotic birds in a park-like landscape (died 1695)
Francesco Vaccaro, Italian painter of landscapes and engraver (died 1675)
Antonio Verrio, Italian-born mural painter (died 1707)

Deaths
January 19 - Marcus Gheeraerts the Younger, Artist of the Tudor court, portraitist (born 1561/1562)
January 22 - Gregorio Fernández, Spanish sculptor Castilian school of sculpture (born 1576)
April 6 - Philipp Uffenbach, German painter and etcher (born 1566)
June 27 - Lambert Jacobsz, Dutch painter (born 1598)
October 10 – Pieter Brueghel the Younger, painter (born 1564)
December 6 - Giovanni da San Giovanni, Italian painter (born 1592)
date unknown
Giovanni Battista Billoni, Italian painter born in Padua (born 1576)
Pietro Paolo Bonzi, Italian painter, best known for his landscapes and still-lifes (born 1576)
Dong Qichang, Chinese painter, scholar, calligrapher, and art theorist of the later period of the Ming Dynasty (born 1555)
Giovanni Giacomo Pandolfi, Italian painter who worked in his native Pesaro (born 1567)
Niccolò Roccatagliata, Italian sculptor (born 1593)
Wen Zhenmeng, Chinese  Ming Dynasty painter, calligrapher, scholar, author, and garden designer (born 1574)
Filippo Zaniberti, Italian Mannerist painter (born 1585)

 
Years of the 17th century in art
1630s in art